This is a list of episodes for the Zorro television series that ran from 1957 to 1961. Seasons 1 and 2 are composed of half-hour episodes. Four one-hour specials followed.

Series overview

Episodes

Season 1 (1957–58)

Season 2 (1958–59)

Specials (1960–61)

Home releases
In 1997, Walt Disney Home Video released the theatrical film The Sign of Zorro, in which portions of the first 13 TV episodes were edited into a feature film, on VHS.

Walt Disney Home Video also released six volumes of episodes from the second season on VHS, each volume comprising a complete story arc:
 Vol. 1: The Secret of El Zorro (Episodes 49-52, guest-starring Richard Anderson)
 Vol. 2: Zorro and the Mountain Man (Episodes 63-65, guest-starring Jonathan Harris)
 Vol. 3: Zorro and the Mystery of Don Cabrillo (Episodes 60-62, guest-starring Annette Funicello)
 Vol. 4: Invitation to Death (Episodes 72-75)
 Vol. 5: The Gay Caballero (Episodes 55-58, guest-starring Cesar Romero)
 Vol. 6: The Man from Spain (Episodes 66-69, guest-starring Everett Sloane)

On November 3, 2009, Disney released the first two seasons on DVD, each in a limited-edition collector's tin in the original black-and-white format.

Buena Vista Home Entertainment also released both seasons in colorized versions (Season One in 2006 in five separate volumes and Season Two in 2009 in a boxed set).

On October 5, 2022, the first two seasons became available to stream on Disney+.

References

Sources
 
 

Zorro (1957 series)
Lists of American Western (genre) television series episodes